Eduardo Blanco is an Argentine actor best known for his roles in the trilogy of films directed by Juan José Campanella, his friend and frequent collaborator: El Mismo Amor, la Misma Lluvia (1999), El Hijo de la Novia (2001) and Luna de Avellaneda (2004).

Biography 
Blanco started as a theater actor, most notably under the direction of Norma Aleandro in Cyrano de Bergerac as well as having roles in Shakespeare plays like A Midsummer Night's Dream and Macbeth. His screen debut was in Victoria 392, where he met and befriended director Juan José Campanella and fellow screenwriter Fernando Castets. Campanella and Castets would later on write roles specifically for him in a trilogy of movies that starred Ricardo Darín as the protagonist and Blanco as his friend: El Mismo Amor, la Misma Lluvia (1999), El Hijo de la Novia (2001) and Luna de Avellaneda (2004). Blanco went on to collaborate a fifth time with Campanella in the TV series, Vientos de agua (2006).

Filmography

Film 
Victoria 392 (1984)
El Mismo Amor, la Misma Lluvia (1999) .... Roberto
Aunque tú no lo sepas (2000) .... Matón 2
El Hijo de la Novia (2001) .... Juan Carlos
Detrás de la imágen (2003, Short)
Conversaciones con mamá (2004) .... Jaime
Luna de Avellaneda (2004) .... Amadeo Grimberg
Dolores de casada (2004)
Tapas (2005) .... Edgardo
Un Minuto de Silencio (2005) .... Ernesto
El Tango de la Psicoanalista (2005)
Naranjo en flor (2008)
Pájaros muertos (2008) .... Hugo
La vida empieza hoy (2010) .... Alfredo
Una hora más en Canarias (2010) .... Eduardo
180º (2010) .... Dr. Lazarte
El Pozo (2012) .... Franco
Una mujer sucede (2012) .... Santos
20.000 Besos (2013) .... El Jefe
Paternoster (2013) .... Tito
Kamikaze (2014) .... Eugene
Cuando dejes de quererme (2018) .... Fredo

Television 
Duro como la roca... frágil como el cristal (1985)
La viuda blanca (1986) .... Aurelio
Por siempre mujercitas (1995) .... Mauro
El Hombre (1999) .... Gibelli (uncredited)
Primicias (2000) .... Zorlegui
El sodero de mi vida (2001) .... Filkenstein
Franco Buenaventura, el profe (2002) .... Omar Peña
Historias de sexo de gente común (2005) .... Daniel
Mujeres asesinas (2005)
Vientos de agua (2006) .... Ernesto Olaya

External links

Argentine male actors
Living people
Year of birth missing (living people)